The Republican Party for Liberty (PRL) was a political party in Upper Volta (now Burkina Faso). The PRL was founded in 1959 by Nazi Boni as a reaction to the attempts by the Voltaic Democratic Union to create a one-party state. Boni built his new party largely out of the ashes of the defunct African Regroupment Party (PRA).

PRL was short-lived and failed to make any major impact. Boni went into exile in Dakar, Senegal.

References
Englebert, Pierre. La Revolution Burkinabè. Paris: L'Harmattan, 1986.

Defunct political parties in Burkina Faso
Political parties established in 1959
1959 establishments in Upper Volta